Klippeneck is a corner of the Großer Heuberg plateau in Baden-Württemberg, Germany.

It is known for a gliding airfield.

A favourite place to visit on the Swabian Alb is the Dreifaltigkeitsberg (Holy Trinity Hill) with its  summit and its famous pilgrimage church. The path runs along part of the Donauberglandweg (Danube mountain country path), which has been awarded the seal of “Qualitätsweg Wanderbares Deutschland” (“Walkable Germany’s Quality Paths”) by the German Ramblers association. 

Mountains and hills of the Swabian Jura